The Portuguese Singles Chart ranks the best-performing singles in Portugal, as compiled by the Associação Fonográfica Portuguesa.

See also
 List of number-one albums of 2018 (Portugal)

References

Portugal
Number one singles
Singles 2018